
Beverley School is a community special school in Middlesbrough, England. The school supports children with autism and is based in a campus with another school, Hollis Academy (formally Prince Bishop School).

Originally opened as a special school for hearing-impaired children back in the mid-1970s, the school began to admit children with autism in the 1980s and is now a regional centre of excellence.

Since Easter 2011 Beverley School has shared a campus with Hollis Academy (formerly Prince Bishop School).

Headteacher Nigel Carden retired in 2011 and was replaced by Joanne Smith in 2012, following a year where another local special school head teacher stepped in as active head due to the successful candidate for headship accepting the role before later withdrawing at a point where notice periods prevented a suitable replacement being found to begin the next academic year in September 2011. Pippa Irwin took over in September 2020 after Joanne Smith retired.

References

Special schools in Middlesbrough
Community schools in Middlesbrough
Educational institutions established in the 1970s
1970s establishments in England